Bimal Chandra Tarafdar (born 6 July 1974) is a former Bangladeshi sprinter. He won the gold medal in the 100-metres sprint in the 1991 South Asian Games in Colombo.

Tarafdar competed in the men's 100m competition at the 1996 Summer Olympics. He recorded a 10.98, not enough to qualify for the next round past the heats. His personal best is 10.57, set in 1996.

References

External links
 

1974 births
Living people
Bangladeshi male sprinters
Athletes (track and field) at the 1996 Summer Olympics
Olympic athletes of Bangladesh
Athletes (track and field) at the 1994 Commonwealth Games
Commonwealth Games competitors for Bangladesh
South Asian Games gold medalists for Bangladesh
South Asian Games medalists in athletics
Bangladeshi Hindus